Tuthmose was the Viceroy of Kush during the reign of Akhenaten. Tuthmose was given the titles King's Son of Kush, Overseer of the Gold Lands of Amun, Overseer of masons, Overseer of the borderlands of His Majesty, and Fan-bearer on the King's right.

In year 12 of Akhenaten, Tuthmose was ordered to put down a rebellion by some of the Nubians, according to a stela set up at Buhen. Here were found the fragments of the stela mentioning this rebellion and a viceroy of Kush. The latter's name is lost but it seems likely that it was Tuthmose as he is so far the only known viceroy of Kush datable under Akhenaten.

References

Viceroys of Kush
Officials of the Eighteenth Dynasty of Egypt